The swimming events of the 1991 Mediterranean Games were held in Athens, Greece. It was a long course (50 metres) event.

Medallists

Men's events

Women's events

Medal table

References
 International Mediterranean Games Committee

Mediterranean Games
Sports at the 1991 Mediterranean Games
1991